Gnaeus Octavius (died 162 BC) was a Roman politician and general who served as consul in 165 BC and was the builder of the Porticus Octavia.

Family 
Octavius was from the plebeian gens Octavia and was the first member of the gens to be elected consul. His father also had the praenomen Gnaeus and was a praetor in 205 BC who fought in the Second Punic War. His grandfather, Gnaeus Octavius Rufus was quaestor  230 BC.

Career

Ambassadorship in Greece 
In the winter of 170 BC, Octavius and Gaius Popillius Laenas served as ambassadors in Greece under Aulus Hostilius Mancinus, where they enforced a decree by the Senate asserting the Senate's control over Roman magistrates stationed in Greece. At Aegium, the ambassadors spoke with the Achaeans, assuring that the Romans were on good terms with them. However, on entering Aetolia, they were not as well-received and demanded hostages. Lastly, they then went to Thyrium in Acarnania without having settled the disputes in Aetolia. There, they heard from opposing groups of Acarnanians who were debating war with the Macedonians.

Campaign in Macedonia 
Octavius served as praetor in 168 BC and was given control of the Roman fleet in the Third Macedonian War. After the consul Lucius Aemilius Paullus Macedonicus defeated Perseus at Pydna, Octavius took the Roman fleet to Samothrace in pursuit of Perseus. Perseus surrendered himself to Octavius and was brought to Macedonicus at Amphipolis. The next year, 167, Octavius transported the spoils from the Macedonian War and received a triumph. Using the spoils from war, Octavius built a house on the Palatine Hill, increasing his status in Rome and ultimately acting as a factor in his being elected consul alongside Titus Manlius Torquatus in 165 BC. It was at this time that Octavius also built the extravagant Porticus Octavia, which was restored by Augustus but was destroyed sometime before the time of Pliny the Elder.

Ambassadorship in Syria 
In 162 BC, Octavius was sent as an ambassador to Syria with two colleagues, Spurius Lucretius and Lucius Aurelius, with the purpose of enforcing the terms of peace agreed upon by Antiochus III the Great amidst the chaos between those vying for the guardianship of the young king Antiochus V Eupator. It was during this assignment that Octavius was assassinated at the Gymnasium at Laodicea by the Syrian Leptines.

References 

Ancient Roman generals
2nd-century BC Roman consuls
Octavii Rufi
162 BC deaths
Year of birth unknown
2nd-century BC diplomats